Marzuki bin Haji Yahya (born 4 September 1970) is a Malaysian politician. He is a member of the Parti Bumiputera Perkasa Malaysia (PUTRA), a former member of the Homeland Fighters' Party (PEJUANG) and its Deputy President from August 2020 to his resignation in January 2023, and a former member of the Malaysian United Indigenous Party (BERSATU) and its Secretary-General from September 2018 to his termination from position in March 2020. He served as the Deputy Minister of Foreign Affairs in the Pakatan Harapan (PH) administration under former Prime Minister Mahathir Mohamad from July 2018 to the collapse of the PH administration in February 2020 and Senator from July 2018 to July 2021.

Education 
Marzuki had been accused of making a false claim that he holds a Bachelor of Business Administration from the University of Cambridge via distance learning. However, it was later revealed that the University of Cambridge does not offer any distance learning degree. He later clarified that he in fact obtained his degree from Cambridge International University, which is not affiliated or related to the University of Cambridge. Cambridge International University was reportedly a non-accredited institution and a diploma mill.

Political career 
Marzuki's involvement in the political arena began in 1998 when he was appointed as the Treasurer for United Malays National Organisation (UMNO) Youth Bagan Division. After holding several other posts in UMNO, he eventually left the party and became one of the founding members of then-opposition PPBM, led by former UMNO President, 4th and 7th Prime Minister of Malaysia Dr. Mahathir Mohamad, in 2016.

He contested the Tasek Gelugor parliamentary seat in the 14th Malaysian general election but lost with the narrowest of margins overall, at just 81 votes. Shortly thereafter, he was appointed as a Senator in the upper house of the Parliament of Malaysia and sworn-in as a deputy minister by the Yang di-Pertuan Agong on 17 July 2018. On 18 November 2018, Chief Justice of Malaysia Richard Malanjum ordered the petition filed by Marzuki challenging the results of the election to go to trial. The petition was struck out by the Election Court on 15 February 2019.

Election results

Honours 
 :
 Officer of the Order of the Defender of State (DSPN) – Dato' (2018)
  :
  Knight Commander of the Exalted Order of Malacca (DCSM) – Datuk Wira (2019)

See also 
 Tasek Gelugor (federal constituency)

References 

1970 births
Living people
People from Kedah
Malaysian people of Malay descent
Malaysian Muslims
Former Malaysian United Indigenous Party politicians
Former United Malays National Organisation politicians
Members of the Dewan Negara
Alumni of the University of Cambridge
21st-century Malaysian politicians